The Inclosure Act 1773 (13 Geo 3. c. 81) (also known as the Enclosure Act 1773) is an Act of the Parliament of the Kingdom of Great Britain, passed during the reign of George III. The Act is still in force in the United Kingdom. It created a law that enabled enclosure of land, at the same time removing the right of commoners' access.

Effect 
The Act required the procedure to start with a petition delivered to Parliament signed by the landowner, tithe holders and a majority of people affected. The petition then went through the stages of a bill with a committee meeting to hear any objections. The petition would then go through to royal assent after passing through both Houses of Parliament. Commissioners would then visit the area and distribute the land accordingly. 

The powers granted in the Inclosure Act were often abused by landowners: the preliminary meetings where enclosure was discussed, intended to be held in public, were often made in the presence of only the local landowners. They regularly chose their own solicitors, surveyors and commissioners to decide on each case. In 1774, Parliament added an amendment to the Act under the standing orders that every petition for enclosure had to be affixed to the door of the local church for three consecutive Sundays in August or September.

The Act eventually limited the amount of traffic on culverted paths as they often fell within land that was to be enclosed. This often meant that traffic eventually stopped going along certain routes such as the culverted path next to Shit Brook in Much Wenlock.

See also 
 Inclosure Acts

References

External links
 Peter Lazenby: Give back Britain's common land (The Guardian)

Great Britain Acts of Parliament 1773
Enclosures